NGC 4609 (also known as Caldwell 98) is an open cluster in the southern constellation of Crux.

External links
 
 NGC 4609 at WEBDA
 

Crux (constellation)
Open clusters
4609
098b